Nodeland is a village in Kristiansand municipality in Agder county, Norway. Nodeland was the administrative centre of former Songdalen municipality which was merged into Kristiansand in 2020. The village is the main urban area of Songdalen area, surrounded by several smaller villages such as Nodelandsheia, Brennåsen, Volleberg, and Hortemo.

Nodeland Station is a railway station along the Sørlandet Line. All trains between Kristiansand and Stavanger (except overnight trains) stop in the village at this station. Greipstad Church is also located in Nodeland and it was the main church for the municipality.

References

Villages in Agder
Geography of Kristiansand